The Troyanovo-3 coal mine is a large coal mine located in Burgas Province. Troyanovo-3 represents one of the largest coal reserve in Bulgaria having estimated reserves of 336.2 million tonnes of coal and an annual coal production of around 2 million tonnes.

References 

Coal mines in Bulgaria